The 2017–2020 ICC Women's Championship was the second edition of the ICC Women's Championship, a Women's One Day International cricket (WODI) competition that was contested by eight teams, to determine qualification for the 2022 Women's Cricket World Cup. The top four teams, along with hosts New Zealand, qualified directly for the World Cup. The remaining three teams progressed to the 2021 Women's Cricket World Cup Qualifier tournament.

In the previous tournament, the first three WODIs counted towards qualification. However, for this tournament, the International Cricket Council (ICC) requested that additional matches are played as Women's Twenty20 Internationals (WT20Is). Inline with the updated ICC rules, two balls were used for the first time in WODI matches.

When originally announced in October 2017, the top three teams, along with hosts New Zealand, would qualify for the World Cup. In October 2018, the qualification structure was changed allowing the hosts plus the top four teams to qualify directly for 2022 World Cup.

The first set of fixtures were announced by the Pakistan Cricket Board (PCB), with Pakistan playing New Zealand in the United Arab Emirates in October 2017. The first round of fixtures to be played were between the West Indies and Sri Lanka, which started on 11 October 2017. In the opening fixture of the championship, the West Indies beat Sri Lanka by 6 wickets.

In March 2019, England beat Sri Lanka 3–0. The result meant that Sri Lanka Women could no longer qualify directly for the 2022 Women's Cricket World Cup, progressing to the 2021 Women's Cricket World Cup Qualifier tournament instead. In September 2019, the ICC confirmed that Australia were the first team to qualify for the World Cup. In October 2019, Australia took an unassailable points lead to win the ICC Women's Championship trophy for the second time in a row. In February 2020, the Australian team were presented with the ICC Women's Championship trophy, ahead of their Women's Twenty20 International (WT20I) match against India.

The COVID-19 pandemic forced the cancellation of the series between South Africa and Australia in March 2020. Two unscheduled series, New Zealand against Sri Lanka and Pakistan against India, were also thrown into doubt due to the pandemic. On 3 April 2020, New Zealand Cricket confirmed that their planned tour of Sri Lanka, scheduled to take place in April, had been cancelled due to the pandemic. However, the result of the series would have no impact on the final standings, as Sri Lanka had already been eliminated, and New Zealand had progressed to the World Cup as hosts. On 15 April 2020, the ICC confirmed that the points would be shared for the three series that were not played.

Results

The breakdown of results is as follows. During each round, each team played against its opponent three times.

Notes:
 The round six fixtures between Pakistan and India should have taken place by the end of November 2019. However, the Pakistan Cricket Board (PCB) did not receive an invitation to play the series from the Board of Control for Cricket in India (BCCI), with the matter referred to the ICC Technical Committee. The series did not go ahead due to a force majeure event, with the BCCI demonstrating it could not get government clearance to play against Pakistan. Points were shared between the teams.

Two round seven fixtures, South Africa hosting Australia and Sri Lanka hosting New Zealand, did not go ahead as scheduled due to the COVID-19 pandemic. Points were shared between the teams.

Points table

Fixtures

2017–18

West Indies v Sri Lanka

Australia v England

Pakistan v New Zealand (in the UAE)

South Africa v India

New Zealand v West Indies

India v Australia

Sri Lanka v Pakistan

2018

England v South Africa

England v New Zealand

2018–19

Sri Lanka v India

West Indies v South Africa

Pakistan v Australia (in Malaysia)

New Zealand v India

Pakistan v West Indies (in the UAE)

South Africa v Sri Lanka

Australia v New Zealand

India v England

Sri Lanka v England

2019

South Africa v Pakistan

England v West Indies

2019–20

West Indies v Australia

Australia v Sri Lanka

West Indies v India

Pakistan v England (in Malaysia)

New Zealand v South Africa

References

External links
 Series home at ESPN Cricinfo

 
ICC Women's Championship
International cricket competitions in 2017–18
International cricket competitions in 2018
International cricket competitions in 2018–19
International cricket competitions in 2019